Anolis cybotes, the large-headed anole, Tiburon stout anole, or Hispaniolan stout anole, is a species of anole endemic to the Tiburon Peninsula of Haiti. Reports from other places likely refer to other species that were formerly included in Anolis cybotes. This species gets its name from the male's strangely large head. It is often brownish in color with lighter stripes on the flanks.

See also
List of Anolis lizards

References 

Anoles
Lizards of the Caribbean
Reptiles of Haiti
Endemic fauna of Haiti
Reptiles described in 1862
Taxa named by Edward Drinker Cope